Catherine O'Neill (born 28 June 1970) is a New Zealand-born Irish former cricketer who played as a right-arm off break bowler and right-handed batter. She appeared in one Test match and 41 One Day Internationals for Ireland between 1993 and 2003. She also spent a season apiece with Auckland and Northern Districts.

References

External links
 
 

1970 births
Living people
Cricketers from Hamilton, New Zealand
Irish women cricketers
Ireland women One Day International cricketers
Ireland women Test cricketers
Northern Districts women cricketers
Auckland Hearts cricketers